Bandol Panchayat (Hindi: सिवनी) बंडोल is a village in the Seoni district of Madhya Pradesh State, India. It belongs to the Jabalpur Division. Bandol is located 16 kilometres north of National Highway No. 7. The village is the geographic area of 706.95 hectares, mostly a large gram panchayat. The Wainganga river flows 2 kilometres west of Bandol village .

Stone Crusher Industrial Area  
Stone crusher is the highest in this area.
These stone crushers are supplied in the surrounding areas. Stone is the most supplied in Balaghat district.

Educational Institute 
 Primary School
 Government Secondary School Bandol 
 Government Medil School Bandol 
 Pre Matric Scheduled Tribes Hostal Bandol
 Saraswati Shishu Mandir School Bandol
 Sanskar Vidya Niketan School Bandol
 Saraswati Gyan Mandir School Bandol
 Belkin Public School Bandol (CBSE)
 Dehradun Public School Bandol (CBSE)

Temples 
 Katyani Mandir Temple
 Gram Devi Mandir
Bhura Bhagat Temple
 Old Shankar Mandir Main Road Temple
 Hanumaan Temple Bazar Bandol
 Banjari Temple

Government Primary Health Center. (Hospital) 
The government primary health center is Bandol which is located in Bakhari Road Bandol.

Animal Feed Plant
It is the only animal feed plant in Seoni district, which is established here with Sanchi Milk Cold Center.

Government Offices
 Police Station Bandol
 Gram Panchayat Office
 Poorv Kshetra Vidyut Vitaran Center Bandol (MPEB DC Office Bandol)
 Forest Office
 Animal Hospital
 Gramin Bank
 Sahkari Bank
 RI Office
 Aganwadi Centre 1,2
 Government Society  & Office
 Post Office

Seoni district